Firouz Alizadeh (30 October 1946 – 2005) was a bantamweight Greco-Roman wrestler from Iran. He won the world title in 1969 and competed at the 1972 Summer Olympics.

References

External links
 

1946 births
2005 deaths
Olympic wrestlers of Iran
Wrestlers at the 1972 Summer Olympics
Iranian male sport wrestlers
World Wrestling Champions
20th-century Iranian people
21st-century Iranian people